Piñor is a municipality in the Spanish province of Ourense. It has a population of 1552 (Spanish 2001 Census) and an area of 53 km².

References  

Municipalities in the Province of Ourense